Japanese hip hop is hip hop music from Japan. It is said to have begun when Hiroshi Fujiwara returned to Japan and started playing hip hop records in the early 1980s. Japanese hip hop tends to be most directly influenced by old school hip hop, taking from the era's catchy beats, dance culture and overall fun and carefree nature and incorporating it into their music. As a result, hip hop stands as one of the most commercially viable mainstream music genres in Japan and the line between it and pop music is frequently blurred.

History of hip hop in Japan
Although rather informal and small scale, the early days of Japanese hip hop provide the history for the emergence of the cultural movement. Early hip hop was not led by corporate interests, but rather was largely ignored by large record companies and performance venues. In this respect, Japanese hip-hop offers a representation of cultural globalization, as it expanded despite criticism on the part of record companies and major media outlets. The history shows that certain kinds of cultural exchange are not initiated through cultural understanding, but instead from some interaction that can incite a desire to learn, to participate, and to contribute individuality. In Japan, this motivation to represent individuality was breakdancing, which was one of the leading edges of hip-hop at the time.

The first known Japanese group to experiment with hip hop was Yellow Magic Orchestra, which created an early electro hip hop track, "Rap Phenomena", for their 1981 album BGM. In turn, the synthpop and electro music of Yellow Magic Orchestra and Ryuichi Sakamoto, and their use of the Roland TR-808 drum machine, had a significant influence on early key American hip hop figures such as Afrika Bambaataa and Mantronix.

An important spark for Japanese hip-hop occurred in 1983 when breakdancing appeared in Tokyo through film and live performances even though American hip hop records could previously be heard in Tokyo discos. According to Takagi Kan, a first generation Japanese MC, "I couldn't tell what was with the rap and the DJing...but with the breakdancing and graffiti art, you could understand it visually. Or rather, it wasn't understanding so much as, 'Whoa, that's cool' [kakkoii]. With rap and DJing, I couldn't imagine what could be cool about it." Dancing has a visual impact that everyone can understand, when it comes to dance there is not a language barrier. Break dancing represented the foundation for the spread of Japanese hip-hop and served as a medium for globalization.

As in Germany, much of Japan was introduced to hip hop in the fall of 1983 with the movie Wild Style. The film is "the classic hip-hop flick, full of great subway shots, breakdancing, freestyle MCing and rare footage of one of the godfathers of hip-hop, Grandmaster Flash, pulling off an awesome scratch-mix set on a pair of ancient turntables." The popularity of the film led to many of the artists involved in it to make a trip to Japan to promote the film and they even performed in some of the department stores while they were there.

Shortly after, Japanese took up breakdancing in Tokyo's Yoyogi Park, where street musicians gather every Sunday to perform. Crazy-A, now the leader of Rock Steady Crew Japan," was one of the pioneers of break dancing in Yoyogi back in the early 1984". Crazy-A organizes the annual "B-Boy Park," which happens every August, and draws a large number of fans and dozens of break dancing groups. This was all considered the Old School Era of rap in Tokyo. There was much of what they called Soul Dancing, which helped the Japanese culture accept the street dance culture.

The rise of DJs was really the next step for the Japanese hip hop scene. Before 1985, there weren't very many DJs on the radio, but with the increase in the number that year, it led to the opening of the first all hip hop club in 1986. But despite the fact that DJing caught on rather quickly, it was initially thought that rapping wasn't going to have the same cache as it would be hard to rap in Japanese.

Street musicians began to breakdance in Yoyogi Park, including DJ Krush who has become a world-renowned DJ after arising from the Yoyogi Park scene. In 1986 an all hip hop club opened in Shibuya. While interest in hip-hop in Japan grew some during the 1980s and early 1990s, the rap scene remained fairly small and rather marginalized. One reason for the rap scene to remain so small and a little bit less popular compared to hip hop is because the Japanese language does "not contain stress accents and sentences must end with one of a few simple verb endings." Ito Seiko, Chikado Haruo, Tinnie Punx and Takagi Kan were rappers that emerged from Japan at this time, and they proved to be rather successful.

1990s 

By the early 1990s, major American artists began to tour Japan, and their music would receive Japanese releases.

The years 1994 and 1995 marked the beginning of hip-hop's commercial success in Japan. The first hit was Schadaraparr's "Kon'ya wa būgi bakku" (Boogie Back Tonight) by Scha Dara Parr and Ozawa Kenji, followed by East End X Yuri's "Da. Yo. Ne." and "Maicca," which each sold a million copies. This sudden popularity of J-rap, which was largely characterized as party rap, sparked a debate over 'realness' and authenticity between commercial and underground hip-hop artists.

Popular brands in Japan during this period also collaborated with multiple hip hop artists. A Bathing Ape (or BAPE) A Japanese clothing company founded by Nigo in 1993. . Artist such as Pharrell Williams, Kanye West, Kid Cudi, and KAWS have collaborated with BAPE.
 
An example of an underground attack on mainstream J-Rap is Lamp Eye's "Shogen," in which rapper You the Rock disses the more pop oriented group Dassen Trio. Writer Ian Condry argues that the rappers on this track are closely emulating the traditional macho posturing of rap, citing influences such as Public Enemy and Rakim.  The video reflects this image in its roughness and tone Dassen Trio, and other pop rappers, respond to such attacks with the argument that their subject matter is more culturally appropriate and accessible for Japanese fans, and question the standards of "realness" put forth by underground rappers.

Actual Japanese rap lyrics have a tendency to refer to mundane subjects such as food, cell phones, and shopping.

2000s, 2010s and 2020s 
Since 2000, the hip hop scene in Japan has grown and diversified. Hip-hop style and Japanese rap has been an enormous commercial success in Japan. In a 2003 interview with the BBC, Tokyo record-store owner, Hideaki Tamura noted "Japanese hip-hop really exploded in the last two, three years. I never thought there would be a time when Japanese records could outsell American ones but it's happening." Additionally, a huge number of new scenes have developed. These include “rock rap to hard core gangsta, spoken word/poetry, to conscious, old school, techno rap, antigovernment, pro-marijuana, heavymetal-sampled rap, and so on.”

Tamura points to a shift in Japanese hip hop, when artists began to focus on issues pertinent to Japanese society, versus previous styles and subjects that were copied from US hip hop culture. For Japan, the style of hip hop was much more appealing than topics popular in American hip hop, such as violence. Ian Condry, on the other hand, focuses on an interplay between local and global hip hop within the genba of Japan. For Condry, Japanese hip hop was born out of simultaneous localization and globalization of hip hop culture, rather than a shift between the two binary factors.

Political aspects

King Giddra's "911" reflects on Ground Zero and its aftermath in two eras: August 1945 and September 11, 2001. It also called for world peace. Groups such as Rhymester tackle issues that are not openly addressed in society. Rhymester member Utamaru talked about the motives for Japanese government support of the U.S.-led invasion of Iraq.

Influence of African American Culture on Japanese hip hop
Previous to the inception of hip hop, soul dancing became popularized in Japan in the 1970s. Shows like 'Soul Train' spread the African-American style of on-going dance that would soon be picked up by varying cultures all over the world. It is this style of dance that laid the foundation for the globalization of African-American culture due to its universal criteria. Anyone can dance to soul music, which is not the case in terms of rapping, b-boying, etc. As movies like 'Flashdance' (1983) reached the islands, more and more young people began dancing on the street and other public arenas, which added to its cultural integration. Soon, Japanese culture was ready to alter the very structure of their language in order to partake in hip hop.

Hip hop was thought to have originally become popular in Japan because the Japanese people wanted to imitate African-Americans. The Japanese would hear these rapper's music spinning in clubs, exposing to them a small, narrow view of American West Coast hip hop. It was not only the music they latched onto, however. They came to love the entire hip hop culture, including the loose-fitting clothes, graffiti writing, and break dancing. Some Japanese hip-hop fans would even go to tanning salons to darken their skin, and style their hair in afros or dreadlocks to imitate the "cool" looks of Africans, although they are ridiculed by others, including other hip-hoppers.

Racial themes 
This style is called burapan - "the name given to the fashion sensibilities of all black wannabes." and is similar to the English term wigger. The term burapan, though, has a derogatory history stemming from the WW2 occupation of Japan. Japanese law at the beginning of the American occupation legalised prostitution and created specific brothels to service allied occupation forces such as the Recreation and Amusement Association, in order to stop the rape and sexual assault of local women.

These prostitutes became known as panpan, a euphemism used by the American soldiers when hunting for a prostitute. Pan derives from the American company Pan American World Airways and combines with the Japanese word pan meaning bread (thus these girls were also euphemistically known as bread girls) The more attractive girls often had to service "white bread" or white soldiers and were known as yagipan with yagi being the Japanese word for goat, a white hairy animal. Less attractive girls serviced "black bread" or black soldiers and were known as burapan with bura deriving from the Japanese word burakumin relating to social stigma. Therefore, a burapan is literally "a woman who prostitutes herself for black men."

Although the word has come to describe a trend of dress and culture modeled after Africans, it is inherently problematic because of its origins. The soundtrack of Wild Style was marketed in Japan as a cassette with a book of photos-scenes from the film, neighborhoods, breakers, graffiti, etc. Japan's hip hop contributions have been perceived by many to be based more on appearances than anything else.

A subculture of hip-hoppers who subscribe to the burapan style are referred to as blackfacers, a reference to the blackface style of makeup used in minstrel acting that began as an imitation or caricaturation of Africans. One Japanese pop group, the Gosperats, has been known to wear blackface makeup during performances, who were influenced by the 80's doo wop group Chanels. The appearance of these "Jiggers" has shown a growing popularity with the hip-hop subculture in Japan despite what can be viewed as racial ideological tendencies of the country towards Black people, and all non-Japanese in general. There are roughly 50,000 Africans in Japan; which is approximately .04% of the Japanese population. Although such an insignificant percent of the Japanese population is African, Japanese subculture is very much accepting of African culture. For many rebellious Japanese youth it provides an outlet for "coolness" and a chance to express themselves outside the box.

However, some Japanese fans of hip-hop find it embarrassing and ridiculous that these blackface fans do this because they feel like they shouldn't change their appearance to embrace the culture. In some instances it can be seen as a racist act, but for many of the young the Japanese fans it is a way of immersing in the hip hop culture the way they see fit. For example, the Japanese hip hop group Soul'd Out is extremely imitative of African culture. Looking at Soul'd Out, their appearance stands out. Their wardrobe undoubtedly reminds one of African American fashion.

Even as Japanese hung Sambo signs throughout the city, they were undeniably attracted to black music and style. Before hip hop, the Japanese had embraced jazz, rock n roll and funk. It is important to note however, despite the seemingly racist tendencies toward Africans and the simultaneous embrace of black culture, the Japanese have a very different construction of racial ideology then the US. Whereas the white versus black dichotomy typifies the racial system in the US, the Japanese construct their identities in terms of nationalism. Rather than identifying strongly with a color, Japanese tradition speaks to a homogeneous society that places foreigners in the "other category."  Because of this context, "jiggers" and the young teens who wear blackface rebel by embracing individual identities that are different from the norm.

Blackface 
People who tan in order to get a darker skin complexion (especially the females, mainly those who are part of the ganguro subculture) are considered blackfacers. These Japanese men and women tend to embrace their assumed skin color and party with black people, especially African soldiers and Africans who have moved to Japan. The use of blackface is seen by some as a way to rebel against the culture of surface images in Japan. Blackface is used as a way to connect with African-Americans and the hegemonic racial structure that exists in the United States. Japan is seen as a homogenous and insular group, and the use of blackface shows that the youth of Japan are not only concerned with Japanese issues, but issues on a global level.

Those partaking in blackface are "ordinary high school and college kids" and they pursue African American "blackness" with great passion. Their dedication to this cultural transformation is evident through their interest in even more underground American hip hop acts such as the Boot Camp Clik. As they appear almost obsessed with all things that are "black".
It is said that the Buraoan style is on the downswing. Mikako, a fashion analyzer, says that "the 'cool' that my friend at the nightclub aspired to wouldn't be 'cool' for very long".

Noted in Joe Wood's article, "The Yellow Negro", "Japan in the eighties seemed a lot like America in the fifties." In other words, the socio-economic conditions for white American middle-class children (white negroes) in the 1950s and their Japanese counterpart (Japanese blackfacers) in the 1980s allowed unprecedented cultural deviance to occur. It is the wealth and prosperity characteristic of these demographic groups at these specific points in time that can lend us understanding to when, why, and how one culture can most fluidly assimilate into another. Ironically, both cultures adopted black cultural practices in the midst of a post-war boom. In the case of Japan, the 'Japanese Miracle' gave many middle-class families the financial padding necessary for such diverse consumerism.

Rebelling against the conformity and homogeneity of Japanese society, Japanese blackfacers took it a step further by uniquely adapting the physical look of black culture by literally tanning their faces to seem more 'black.' To Japanese hip-hop fans and to Japanese culture, the hip-hop phenomena severely influenced Japanese youth. Japanese hip hop is just an animation. It mimics only the style of American hip hop, not the meaning.

Some critics of Japanese hip hop believe that it simply follows a long line of black music that ultimately gained popularity through a different ethnic group mimicking the music. The "Elvis Effect" occurs "when white participation in traditionally black avenues of cultural production produces feelings of unease." It occurs whenever a white person attempts a historically black art-form, is discovered to critical acclaim, and this is what leads to that art-form receiving widespread commercial acceptance. Aside from Elvis Presley, notable examples throughout music history include Dave Brubeck, Eric Clapton, and Eminem. Many critics believe that this concept is relevant to Japanese and other forms of global hip hop. If listeners first discover Hip Hop through a Japanese artist, there is the fear that they will never bother learning about hip hop's origins and simply continue to listen to strictly Japanese versions of the genre.

Japanese hip hop dance scene
Dancing is an important aspect of the hip-hop culture. Before hip-hop was popular in Japan, there was soul dancing, which provided a foundation for Japanese acceptance of street dance culture. A big break through time for the dance scene in Japan was after the movies "Flashdance," "Wild Style", and "Beat Street". This was only the beginning of the dance explosion in Japan. The New York hip hop scene also had a large impact on the dance influence in Japan. Lalah Hathaway's "Baby Don't Cry" music video had a large impact on dancers in Japan and started to mold the style into something closer to the NY sophisticated dance style.

This attracted many Japanese people to NY to see this style of dancing for themselves. In addition in 1992 the form of street dancing known as "house" emerged from the influence of music videos as well. It took very well to the culture in Japan and is now well known. Wood discusses in his writing "Yellow Negro" the influence that race plays on the club scene and the type of dancing and music played in Japan depends on the racial composition of its guests. The club scene is a very important scene for the Japanese people to be able to express hip hop in a visual way that stretches across all barriers regardless of language.

Language
Initially language was a barrier for hip-hop in Japan. Rappers only rapped in English because it was believed that the differences between English and Japanese would make it impossible to rap in Japanese. Unlike English, the Japanese language ends phrases in auxiliary verbs. Whereas English ends in verbs or nouns, which are extremely common, Japanese rappers were limited by the small number of grammatically correct possibilities for ending a phrase. Japanese also lacks the stresses on certain syllables that provide flow to English rapping. Even traditional Japanese poetry was based on the numbers of syllables present, unlike English poetry, which was based on the stresses in a line. Most Japanese lyrical music was also formulated using textual repetition, not relying on the flow of the words.

The Japanese also have many ways of indicating class distinctions. English is seen as more direct, one far more suited to the tough quality presented in hip-hop. Eventually, artists began translating music from English to Japanese and performing those direct translations, often leaving the bridge of the song in English to keep the catchiness of the rhymes and flow. Slowly, with the increase in popularity of rap in Japan, more rappers began using Japanese. Rappers added stressed syllables to their music, altering the natural flow of the language to fit into traditional hip-hop. American injections were also used in raps to help the flow of the music and often homonyms were placed in raps, which appealed both to the global English-speaking audience and to Japanese speakers, who often would understand the double meanings intended. Japanese was found to allow subtle put downs in raps, which appealed to many audiences.

Rhymes were also added to Japanese hip-hop by altering the basic structure of the language by eliminating the final auxiliary verbs in raps and instead placing key words at the end of lines. Additionally, to make Japanese work in a rhyming setting, the rappers change the language by using slang, derogatory terms, regional variations, gendered variations, and bilingual puns so that  "more hip-hop" means the creation of "more Japanese." Rappers are able to express themselves using mature lyrics and "create" new language that does not inhibit their rhyming. As such, Japanese hip-hop music is often praised for its mature and culturally relevant lyrics.

English phrases were also put at the end of lines where a Japanese word could not be found to fit. This made rhyming in Japanese far easier, both in basic language and in regard to themes like the concept of social responsibility versus emotional needs.

In the late 1980s and early 1990s it was thought "rap" needed definition before rhyme. Rappers like mc Bell and Cake-K explain that rap is talking with rhythm and melody. Mc Bell argues that rap cannot exist without rhyme: "you need words ending with the same sound...three rhymes in a measure is called three-link rhyming." English is perceived as cool so that Japanese rappers usually add typical phrases such as 'check it out!', 'say ho!', 'awww shit!', and 'Goddamn!' According to Shuhei Hosokawa, those phrases are incidentally added and "the phonetic quality of black verbal expression is sometimes adopted" as well. He also notes that in Japanese Hip-Hop, the "semantics matter, yet so do phonetics...meaningful wording" is important, as is "playful rhyming".

Venues and events
Genba, also known as the actual site, is the place and space for established and future underground hip-hop artists to gain and maintain recognition. It is here in these venues and night clubs that the artist performs and networks with people from the music industry, the audience, and the media. If the artist is a crowd favorite, the audience cheers or dances and this in a way decides the fate.

Without such genba acknowledgments, artists would disappear from the scene. Conversely, the business success of some rappers is not rejected but seen with a touch of envy, especially if they manage to go frequently to nightclubs like Zeebra to sustain their networks and keep up to date on the latest trends.

Before the turn of the new millennium, genba served as a places where Japanese hip hop culture was created and born. In the city of Tokyo, between the youth shopping districts of Shibuya and Harajuku, there was created a genba – a fathering point for youthful fans and performers. Traffic was stopped, and people and artists were able to perform and express themselves outside in this very public arena. This area became known as "Hokouten," short for hokousha tengoku, which means "pedestrian paradise."

Thumpin' Camp was one of the most memorable and largest hip hop events that occurred in Japan. July 7, 1996 is an unforgettable day for many rappers, as well as the fans; about four thousand people attended the show. Males were more attracted to this hip hop scene than females; thus, about 80% of the audience was male adolescents. Over thirty rappers, DJs, and break-dancers from the underground scene performed in the show. This event touched many young individuals who were passionate about hip hop. The Thumpin’Camp show left a remarkable memory in the hip hop history in Japan.

Japan boasts a variety of clubs, which, although they are "open to all races...the kind of music played depends on the race of the next largest racial group." That group, being next largest to the Japanese, who can be found at each of the different clubs. The clubs that only play hip hop and reggae are attended mostly by black people. In the clubs frequented by Japanese people and those that white people attend, there is an even proportion of race and gender. In these clubs, you will generally find equal numbers of Japanese men and women, and a fairly even proportion of racially different men and women.

As aforementioned, genba is agreeably one of the most prominent and core place for hip hop in Japan, there is however a visible shift and spread/increase of Japanese hip hop venues. Among these are clubs, crowds on streets and many more. According to Ian Condry, in his book he outlines the idea and fact that, clubs have become one of the most convenient and top promoting places for Japanese hip hop. Great Djs and turntable-lists use clubs to as venues to not promote other rappers, by that spreading the hip-hop culture, bring and promote new songs and their own hip hop work. Referring to some sources such as, the above named source is a Japanese hip hop forum that also focuses on clubs in Japan. The above source also services proof of Dj and upcoming artists naming places, clubs, Street gatherings of where they are going to be so as to promote their work or any artist they are interested in. The above all in all justifies the view that Japanese Hip hop venues are not just genba but have rather taken and shift or taking a shift into a variety of places such as the ones named above.

Notable Japanese artists
One major Japanese hip hop group, Rhymester, has expressed opinions on various global and philosophical issues through their lyrics. Rhymester has put out motivating messages through hip hop, with songs like "B-Boyism" that emphasizes improving oneself, with lyrics such as "I'm not surrendering this aesthetic flattering no one, I improve myself only the wonderful, useless people get it, and roar, at the edge of the bass."  The group has also written socially critical lyrics, in songs attacking the Japanese government, as well as the United States for invading Iraq. Rhymester is also known for its collaborative work with the Funky Grammar Unit in the 1990s, as well as its participation in hip hop battles.

Another major group of Japanese hip-hop is King Giddra. They are one of the few pioneers of Japanese hip-hop. They began their hip hop careers in 1993 and felt hip-hop was needed in Japan. Group members, Zeebra and K Dub Shine, both of whom had lived in the U.S., were convinced of the necessity for hip-hop to be about issues of social opposition. They used hip-hop to address social issues of the time, such as: the inability of college graduates to find employment and the media overload of advertising sex and violence. They also "challenged youth not only to recognize the difficulties faced by Japanese society but also to speak up about them." Their first album has been cited as being influential in the development of rapping style in Japanese.

Dabo is one of the first hip hop artists in Japan. He sprung to the scene in the 1990s and has fame all over Japan. He is the first Japanese artist to be signed to Def Jam Japan. He is also disliked for his style of hip hop, which is said to be imitation of African American Hip Hop. Many Japanese musicians feel that artists similar to Dabo are just mimicking what they see in American hip hop and is not unique in any sense.

Another influential rap artist in Japan is female rapper, Hime. In her music, she employs a strong message to empower women in Japanese culture. Many of her songs combat the common stereotype of women in Japanese culture. She calls herself "the voice of the Japanese doll," in attempts to challenge and reinvent stereotypes that label women as quiet and obedient. Another common stereotype used to degrade women in Japan is the term yellow cab, which is used to describe a woman who is sexually provocative or whorish. In her song, Yellow cab, Hime cleverly deconstructs the derogatory connotations of this term. By contextualizing yellow cab as defining a woman who is in the driver's seat, Hime transforms its meaning in attempts to empower Japanese women.

Another influential artist in Japan is a male singer Toshinobu Kubota. Kubota is a Japanese singer who is originally from Shizuoka, Japan. Kubota is known as the pioneer of soul music in Japan. His music styles have varied over the years, from pop-oriented sounds through to reggae and soul. Kubota made his Japanese debut in 1986 with the album, Shake It Paradise. His popularity peaked with his award-winning 1990 release, "Bonga Wanga." Kubota's albums have consistently sold over a million copies each in Japan. According to a reading from the yellow negro, some Japanese artist have made reference to profound attraction to black music and style. They have embraced jazz, rock 'n' roll, funk, and other forms of African American expression.

Additionally, Hime has revolutionized the rhyming patterns in rap songs by embracing traditional Japanese poetic forms such as tanka in her song "If the Peony Stands." In her use of this intricate form, she embraces and fuses Japanese culture with traditional American hip hop styling. Hip hop is also an outlet for Japanese minority groups such as Burakumin and Koreans in Japan to express their experiences. Jin Black is a rapper who writes about his life in a Burakumin neighborhood.

One of the propelling factors of the explosion of hip hop onto the music scene in Japan is the fashion aspect. At hip hop nightclubs, often owned and run by Africans, one would find clubbers wearing hip hop clothing typical of American youth such as oversized shirts, Tommy Hilfiger jeans and baseball caps. This macho look is even found on the women. In Tokyo you are most likely to find the latest fashions amongst the youth including burapan, the black wannabe fashion. Shibuya is a center of youth culture in Tokyo, where hip hop's growing presence can be most experienced. Here many stores offer hip hop clothing including the Bathing Ape line. Bape has been worn by Pharrell Williams and other popular hip hop artists of America. The hip hop clothing available in many of these stores can be very expensive. Hip hop fashion is now also popular in the suburbs - although some people are only following fashion trends and are not necessarily into hip hop music. Hip hop's presence can definitely be seen on the youth of Japan as they use their clothing to express themselves.

Nujabes (Jun Yamada) was another heavy influence on the evolution of hip-hop in Japan. While not exactly a rapper himself, he lived as a record producer, audio engineer, DJ,arranger, and composer. He acted a trailblazer in both Jazz Rap and Lo-Fi (Low Fidelity).  Shing02, was a frequent collaborator on the luv(sic) hexology.

Japanese influence on current hip-hop
Japanese Denim is very popular amongst modern hip-hop culture. From Evisu to Red Monkey which are notable by many American hip-hop artists, show the spread of Japanese culture in to hip-hop.

Japanese art has been an influence on hip hop culture as well. Takashi Murakami paints Japanese cultural objects and icons repetitiously and markets them on all sorts of products including keychains, mouse pads, T-shirts and Louis Vuitton handbags. He is responsible for Kanye West's Graduation and Kids See Ghosts album covers.

See also

List of Japanese hip hop musicians
Anime in hip hop

References

External links